The 1986 Illinois gubernatorial election was held on November 4, 1986. Republican candidate James R. Thompson won a fourth term in office, defeating the Illinois Solidarity Party nominee, United States Senator Adlai Stevenson III, by around 400,000 votes.

Stevenson, a Democrat, originally ran for and received that party's gubernatorial nomination. However, his preferred candidate lost the lieutenant gubernatorial nomination to Mark J. Fairchild in the primary (primaries for both major parties were held March 18, 1986). When it came out after the primary that Fairchild was a member of the LaRouche movement, Stevenson dropped off of the Democratic gubernatorial ticket to avoid running with Fairchild, and instead ran on the third party Solidarity Party ticket. The Democratic ticket, ultimately running Fairchild on the ballot alone as a lieutenant gubernatorial nominee without a gubernatorial nominee atop the ticket, only just managed to surpass the 5% mark needed for the party to retain their major party status in Illinois after the election.

Election information
The primaries and general elections coincided with those for federal offices (Senate and House), as well as those for other state offices. The election was part of the 1986 Illinois elections.

Turnout
The primaries saw turnout of 21.10% in the gubernatorial primaries, with 1,289,162 votes cast, and turnout of 18.01% in the lieutenant gubernatorial primaries, with 1,100,110 votes cast.

Turnout during the general election was 52.37%, with 3,143,978 votes cast.

Democratic primary
The 1986 election was a rematch of the 1982 election, which had been narrowly won by Thompson over Adlai Stevenson III by about 5,000 votes out of over 3.5 million votes cast.  However, Stevenson's efforts were largely derailed in the primary when the candidates he supported for Lieutenant Governor (George Sangmeister) and Secretary of State (Aurelia Pucinski) were both upset by Mark J. Fairchild and Janice Hart.  While not heavily publicized during the primaries, Fairchild and Hart were followers of the controversial Lyndon LaRouche.  When this became public knowledge after the primaries, Stevenson was forced to abandon his Democratic Party nomination and run as a third-party candidate.  As of 2016, this remains the last time a third party candidate finished in the top two in the Illinois governor's race.

Stevenson made it clear right after learning his running mate was to be a LaRouche supporter that he would "never run on a ticket with candidates who espouse the hate-filled folly of Lyndon LaRouche".

Governor
Adlai Stevenson III, former United States Senator and 1982 gubernatorial nominee, defeated Larry Burgess in the Democratic primary.

Originally Neil Hartigan had declared himself a candidate for governor, but after Stevenson's entrance into the race, he instead opted to run for reelection as Illinois Attorney General.

Lieutenant Governor

Republican primary

Governor 
Incumbent James R. Thompson defeated his sole challenger, Peter Bowen.

Lieutenant Governor
Incumbent George Ryan won the Republican primary for lieutenant governor, running unopposed.

Third-party nominations
Adlai Stevenson III's newly-formed Illinois Solidarity Party nominated him for governor and Mike Howlett for lieutenant governor. Stevenson opted to avoid having his ticket spoiling the performance of non-LaRouche affiliated Democratic nominees for statewide office by having political unknowns nominated on his Solidarity slate for all offices except lieutenant governor and secretary of state.

The Libertarian Party nominated Gary L. Shilts for governor and Gerry Walsh for lieutenant governor.

The Socialist Workers Party nominated Diane Roling  for governor and Jim Little for lieutenant governor.

Chicago Mayor Harold Washington, a strong supporter of Stevenson's candidacy, worked to combat an attempt by a Black activist to collect signatures for a third-party slate of Black candidates for statewide office, which was seen as likely to threaten Stevenson in a general election by dividing the Black vote.

General election
Thompson's reelection campaign received the backing of incumbent Republican president Ronald Reagan.

References

Gubernatorial
Illinois
1986